Joan Alexander (1 December 1912 – 25 December 2010) was a Scottish soprano well-known for her appearances on the Third Programme and regional radio stations.

Alexander was educated at Hyndland School, the Royal Scottish Academy of Music and Drama and then from 1943 the Munich Conservatoire. She gave many acclaimed performances at the Edinburgh Festival and performed at a number of Proms. She appeared on BBC radio programmes from 1933 through to 1968. She appeared as 'Antonia's Mother' in the 1951 film The Tales of Hoffmann.

References

1912 births
2010 deaths
Scottish operatic sopranos
20th-century Scottish women opera singers
People educated at Hyndland Secondary School
Alumni of the Royal Conservatoire of Scotland
University of Music and Performing Arts Munich alumni